The Nashville Songwriters Hall of Fame was established in 1970 by the Nashville Songwriters Foundation, Inc. in Nashville, Tennessee, United States.  A non-profit organization, its objective is to honor and preserve the songwriting legacy that is uniquely associated with the music community in the city of Nashville. The Foundation's stated purpose is to educate, archive, and celebrate the contributions of the members of the Nashville Songwriters Hall of Fame to the world of music.

The Nashville Songwriters Foundation, Inc., is governed by a board of directors, currently consisting of thirteen members. Annually, three songwriters are inducted into the Hall of Fame.

Inductees

1970s

1970
Gene Autry
 Johnny Bond
 Albert E. Brumley
 A.P. Carter
 Ted Daffan
 Vernon Dalhart
 Rex Griffin
 Stuart Hamblen
 Pee Wee King
 Vic McAlpin
 Bob Miller
 Leon Payne
 Jimmie Rodgers
 Fred Rose
 Redd Stewart
 Floyd Tillman
 Merle Travis
 Ernest Tubb
 Cindy Walker
 Hank Williams, Sr.
 Bob Wills

1971
 Smiley Burnette
 Jenny Lou Carson
 Wilf Carter
 Zeke Clements
 Jimmie Davis
 Alton & Rabon Delmore
 Al Dexter
 Vaughn Horton
 Bradley Kincaid
 Bill Monroe
 Bob Nolan
 Tex Owens
 Tex Ritter
 Carson J. Robison
 Gene Sullivan
 Tim Spencer
 Jimmy Wakely
 Wiley Walker
 Scotty Wiseman

1972
 Boudleaux and Felice Bryant
 Lefty Frizzell
 Jack Rhodes
 Don Robertson

1973
 Jack Clement
 Don Gibson
 Harlan Howard
 Roger Miller
 Ed Nelson, Jr.
 Steve Nelson
 Willie Nelson

1974
 Hank Cochran

1975
 Bill Anderson
 Danny Dill
 Eddie Miller
 Marty Robbins
 Wayne Walker
 Marijohn Wilkin

1976
 Carl Belew
 Dallas Frazier
 John D. Loudermilk
 Moon Mullican
 Curly Putman
 Mel Tillis

1977
 Johnny Cash
 Woody Guthrie
 Merle Haggard
 Kris Kristofferson

1978
 Joe Allison
 Tom T. Hall
 Hank Snow
 Don Wayne

1979
 Rev. Thomas A. Dorsey
 Charles Louvin
 Ira Louvin
 Elsie McWilliams
 Joe South

1980s

1980
 Huddie "Leadbelly" Ledbetter
 Mickey Newbury
 Ben Peters
 Ray Stevens

1981
 Bobby Braddock
 Ray Whitley

1982
 Chuck Berry
 William J. "Billy" Hill

1983
 W.C. Handy
 Loretta Lynn
 Beasley Smith

1984
 Hal David
 Billy Sherrill

1985
 Bob McDill
 Carl Perkins

1986
 Otis Blackwell
 Dolly Parton

1987
 Roy Orbison
 Sonny Throckmorton

1988
 Hoagy Carmichael
 Troy Seals

1989
 Rory Michael Bourke
 Maggie Cavender
 Sanger D. "Whitey" Shafer

1990s

1990
 Sue Brewer
 Ted Harris
 Jimmy Webb

1991
 Charlie Black
 Sonny Curtis

1992
 Max D. Barnes
 Wayland Holyfield

1993
 Red Lane
 Don Schlitz
 Conway Twitty

1994
 Jerry Foster (as Foster & Rice)
 Buddy Holly
 Richard Leigh
 Bill Rice (as Foster & Rice)
 Bobby Russell

1995
 Waylon Jennings
 Dickey Lee
 Dave Loggins

1996
 Jerry Chesnut
 Kenny O'Dell
 Buck Owens
 Norro Wilson

1997
 Wayne Carson
 Roger Cook
 Hank Thompson

1998
 Merle Kilgore
 Eddie Rabbitt
 Kent Robbins

1999
 Tommy Collins
 Wayne Kemp
 A.L. "Doodle" Owens
 Glenn Sutton

2000s

2000
 Mac Davis
 Randy Goodrum
 Allen Reynolds
 Billy Edd Wheeler

2001
 Don Everly
 Phil Everly
 Dennis Linde
 Johnny Russell

2002
 Dean Dillon
 Bob Dylan
 Shel Silverstein

2003
 Hal Blair
 Rodney Crowell
 Paul Overstreet
 John Prine

2004
 Guy Clark
 Freddie Hart
 Dennis Morgan
 Billy Joe Shaver

2005
 Gary Burr
 Vince Gill
 Roger Murrah
 Jerry Reed
 Mike Reid

2006
 Jimmy Buffett
 Hugh Prestwood
 Jim Weatherly

2007
 Bob DiPiero
 Mac McAnally
 Flatt & Scruggs
 Dottie Rambo
 Hank Williams, Jr.

2008
 Matraca Berg
 John Hiatt
 Tom Shapiro

2009
 Kye Fleming
 Mark D. Sanders
Tammy Wynette

2010s

2010
Pat Alger
Steve Cropper
Paul Davis
Stephen Foster

2011
John Bettis
Garth Brooks
Alan Jackson
Thom Schuyler
Allen Shamblin

2012
Tony Arata
Mary Chapin Carpenter
Larry Henley
Kim Williams

2013
Will Jennings
Layng Martine Jr.
Randy Owen
Jeffrey Steele

2014
John Anderson
Paul Craft
Tom Douglas
Gretchen Peters

2015
Rosanne Cash
Mark James
Even Stevens
Craig Wiseman

2016
Aaron Barker
Beth Nielsen Chapman
Bob Morrison
Townes Van Zandt

2017
Walt Aldridge
Dewayne Blackwell
Vern Gosdin
Jim McBride
Tim Nichols

2018
Ronnie Dunn
Byron Hill
Wayne Kirkpatrick
Joe Melson
K.T. Oslin

2019
Larry Gatlin
Marcus Hummon
Kostas Lazarides
Rivers Rutherford
Sharon Vaughn
Dwight Yoakam

2020s
2020
Kent Blazy
Steve Earle
Bobbie Gentry
Brett James
Spooner Oldham

2021
Rhett Akins
Buddy Cannon
Amy Grant
Toby Keith
John Scott Sherrill

2022
Hillary Lindsey
David Malloy
Gary Nicholson
Shania Twain
Steve Wariner

See also
 List of music museums
Songwriters Hall of Fame

References

External links
Nashville Songwriters Hall of Fame (official website)

American country music
Music halls of fame
Halls of fame in Tennessee
Country music songwriters
Culture of Nashville, Tennessee
Songwriting awards
Writers halls of fame